Maksim Konakbayevich Zhumabekov (born 23 June 1999) is a Russian football player who plays for Slavia Mozyr on loan from Khimki.

Club career
He made his debut for the senior squad of FC Khimki on 15 September 2020 in a Russian Cup game against FC Zenit Irkutsk. He made his debut in the Russian Premier League for Khimki on 12 December 2021 in a game against FC Akhmat Grozny.

On 20 February 2023, Zhumabekov was loaned to Slavia Mozyr in Belarus.

References

Career statistics

External links
 
 
 
 

1999 births
People from Domodedovo (town)
Sportspeople from Moscow Oblast
Russian people of Kazakhstani descent
Living people
Russian footballers
Association football forwards
FC Vityaz Podolsk players
FC Arsenal Tula players
FC Khimki players
FC Vitebsk players
FC Slavia Mozyr players
Russian Second League players
Russian Premier League players
Belarusian Premier League players
Russian expatriate footballers
Expatriate footballers in Belarus
Russian expatriate sportspeople in Belarus